Ahmet Peker (born November 4, 1989) is a Turkish sport wrestler in 55 kg division of Freestyle. In 2009, he was named by FILA the best junior wrestler having won the most world championships.

He was born on November 4, 1989, in Harun village of Iskilip district in Çorum Province to Sadullah and his wife Hatice, a farmer family with five children. He began with wrestling at the Adil Candemir Wrestling Training Center in Çorum, and became a member of Amasya Şekerspor Club in Amasya after completing his education. Peker transferred to Bursa Büyükşehir Belediyespor when his club in Amasya closed.

Ahmet Peker is winner of several medals in cadets and juniors class at European and world level. He won the gold medal at the World Junior Wrestling Championships in 2006 held in Guatemala City, Guatemala, in  2008 held in Istanbul and in 2009 Ankara, Turkey. He became the gold medalist at the European Juniors Wrestling Championships in 2007 held at Belgrade, Serbia and in 2009 at Tbilisi, Georgia. He won the bronze medal at the 2012 European Wrestling Championships held in Belgrade, Serbia.

Peker competed at the 2012 Summer Olympics.

In 2016, he won the silver medal in the men's 57 kg event at the 2016 World University Wrestling Championships held in Çorum, Turkey.

References

External links
 

1989 births
People from İskilip
Living people
Olympic wrestlers of Turkey
Wrestlers at the 2012 Summer Olympics
Turkish male sport wrestlers
Mediterranean Games bronze medalists for Turkey
Mediterranean Games medalists in wrestling
Competitors at the 2013 Mediterranean Games
20th-century Turkish people
21st-century Turkish people